The Democratic Party of Albanians (Demokratska Partija na Albancite) or DPA is a political party of ethnic Albanians in North Macedonia. The DPA is a merger of the Party for Democratic Prosperity of Albanians (PDPA) and the People's Democratic Party (NDP) which took place in June 1997. The former party was established in 1994 after some radical members of the Party for Democratic Prosperity, led by Menduh Thaçi and Arbën Xhaferi, left the PDP and the latter party was founded in August 1990 as a more radical opponent of the PDP.

History 
At the 2002 legislative elections, the party won 5.2% of the popular vote and 7 out of 120 seats. The party lost its status as a government party due to the defeat of the VMRO-DPMNE. At the 2006 parliamentary elections, the party increased its support, winning 7.5% of the vote and 11 seats. After the elections the DPA entered the government coalition led by the VMRO-DPMNE. DPA returned to opposition after the 2008 legislative early election.

In the 2011 parliamentary election, DPA received 5.9% of the popular vote, winning 8 seats. This is a loss of 3 seats from the previous election.

Election results

Parliament

References

External links
Official web site 

1997 establishments in the Republic of Macedonia
Albanian nationalist parties
Albanian political parties in North Macedonia
Conservative parties in North Macedonia
Political parties established in 1997